Michael R. Rafferty is an American politician and journalist who served as an editor of Grit and mayor of Williamsport, Pennsylvania from 2000 to 2004.

Early life and education 
Rafferty, a native of Williamsport, graduated from Pennsylvania College of Technology in 1971 and Mount St. Mary's College in Emmitsburg, Maryland in 1973.

Career 
Rafferty worked for Williamsport newspapers starting in 1973, and became the editor of Grit in 1985. He served in that capacity until Stauffer Communications Inc. moved Grit from Williamsport to Topeka, Kansas in 1993. While in that editorial leadership position, the newspaper was known as both a Lycoming County cheerleader, and a solid representation of a very large region, in which Sunday GRIT was the only Sunday publication. He served on Williamsport City Council nine years, including six as council president, before becoming mayor in 2000. Since leaving office in 2004, Rafferty has worked in his family photo processing and graphics design business (Vannucci Foto & Video) and as editor of a local weekly newspaper, Webb Weekly. He retired from Webb Weekly in 2013. He and his wife retired and passed their business on to their son Ryan Rafferty in 2016.

Personal life 
Rafferty is married to the former Patricia Rafferty (née Roth), with whom he has five grown children, ten grandchildren and one great grandchild.

His golf game has been a continuing issue of some contention among members of his family and friends. He is a good player, but a better watcher of tournaments, according to his longtime newspaper and golf colleague, Chuck Yorks.

References 

Year of birth missing (living people)
Living people
Pennsylvania city council members
Mayors of Williamsport, Pennsylvania